Zhou Zikun (1901 – March 14, 1941) was a Chinese communist officer who fought in the first phase of the Chinese Civil War (1927–1937) and the Second Sino-Japanese War, eventually becoming deputy chief of staff of the New Fourth Army.

Early life
Born in Guangxi, Guilin, Zhou graduated from Guangxi's industrial school and participated in the May 4 Movement. He began his military career in the army of a local warlord, rising to battalion commander. Zhou joined the Communist Party of China in October 1925.

Chinese Civil War
Zhou participated in the Nanchang Uprising of 1927 with Zhu De and later retreated with him to the border area of Hunan and Jiangxi provinces in defence of the Chinese Soviet Republic. He rose to divisional commander and deputy chief of staff of the 5th Corps of the Chinese Red Army.

Second Sino-Japanese War and Death
Zhou was appointed deputy to New Fourth Army chief of staff Xiang Ying in December 1937. In the Aftermath of the New Fourth Army Incident, Zhou was murdered in Jing County, Anhui province by Liu Houzong, a member of Xiang's staff. Liu also murdered Xiang and another officer, taking the gold resources of the New Fourth Army and handing them over to the Kuomintang, who gave him a large monetary reward. Liu was jailed by the Nationalists in their wartime capital of Chongqing, but was later freed. Liu's whereabouts after 1949 are unknown, although he may have been caught and executed for his treason.

External links
Site of the Headquarters of the New Fourth Army - http://www.newsofchinese.com/news/15872.html#.U2tfyYFdXE4

1901 births
1941 deaths
Chinese communists
People from Guilin
New Fourth Army generals
Burials in Nanjing